This is a list of Spanish television related events in 1997.

Events 
 31 January: The satellite broadcasting platform Vía Digital is launched.
 7 February: Fernando López-Amor is appointed Director General de RTVE.  
 13 March: Talk show Tómbola, debuts in regional channels Canal 9, Telemadrid y Canal Sur, and sets a new and polemic way to approach celebs news.
 24 July: Telefónica  becomes major stateholder of Antena 3.
 15 September: Canal 24 horas News TV Channel is launched.
 2 December: Consuelo Álvarez de Toledo is appointed press ombudsman in Antena 3.
 31 December: Comic duo Martes y Trece star their last show together, before splitting.

Debuts

Television shows

Ending this year

Foreign series debuts in Spain

Deaths 

 30 January - Cayetano Luca de Tena, 80, director.  
 22 May - José Antonio Silva, 59, host. 
 5 October - Federico Gallo, 67, Host. 
 19 October - Pilar Miró, 57, director.

See also
1991 in Spain
List of Spanish films of 1991

References 

1997 in Spanish television